New Horizon Scholars School, located in Sector 13, Airoli, Navi Mumbai, India, is a pre–primary, primary and secondary school. The pre-primary school is known as "Neo Kids". The school is affiliated with the Central Board of Secondary Education (CBSE) Delhi. 

The school provides a bus service for students to travel from in and around Airoli and other areas including Ghansoli, Mulund, Bhandup, Vikroli, Powai, Thane and Mumbra.

History
New Horizon Scholars School and Neo Kids are run by Nagar Yuwak Shikshan Sanstha Airoli (NYSS). The school was inaugurated by the chairman of NYSS, Mr Subir Kumar Banerjee, on 3 March 2010. The first academic year commenced on 21 June 2010. It was affiliated to the Central Board of Secondary Education Delhi with effect from 1 April 2011.

Curriculum
The school follows the national syllabus as prescribed by Central Board of Secondary Education.

Evaluation
Until 2017, The school followed continuous and comprehensive evaluation for all classes. It consists of formative and summative evaluation, prescribed by the CBSE. 
From 2017 onwards, The School conducted examination as per the remodeled assessment structure prescribed by CBSE

However, for Class-X students appearing in Academic Year 2016-17 examination, the existing scheme of assessment would apply. There are no examinations in the primary and pre–primary classes, but students are evaluated on a continuous basis.

External links
http://www.newhorizonscholars.com

Schools in Maharashtra
Education in Navi Mumbai